The 2007 Oregon Ducks football team represents the University of Oregon in the 2007 NCAA Division I FBS football season. The team was coached by Mike Bellotti and played their home games at Autzen Stadium.

The Ducks rose to a national rank of number 2 in the Bowl Championship Series poll, until an injury to star quarterback Dennis Dixon led to defeat at the hands of the Arizona Wildcats on November 15, 2007.  The Ducks lost to Arizona 34–24 in that game.  They lost the next game to UCLA in Los Angeles as backup quarterback Brady Leaf was also knocked out of the game.  The final score was 16–0.  Oregon lost the season finale to rival Oregon State on December 1, 2007 by a score of 38–31 in two overtimes. Oregon finished the season at 8–4 and qualified for the 2007 Sun Bowl in El Paso.
On December 31, 2007 freshman quarterback Justin Roper, making his first start, passed for 4 touchdowns (tied for a Sun Bowl record) and 180 yards as Oregon crushed the favored South Florida Bulls 56–21.  Jonathan Stewart rushed for a Sun Bowl record and career high 253 yards and a touchdown and was named the game's Most Valuable Player.  The 56 points scored by the Ducks was a Sun Bowl record.  The Ducks finished the 2007 season with a 9–4 record.  They finished with a ranking of 23rd in the final Associated Press Poll.

Previous season
The 2006 Oregon Ducks experienced an incredibly disappointing end to a season last year. After beginning the year with four wins and no losses, and achieving a No. 11 ranking in the AP Poll, the Ducks traveled to Berkeley to face the No. 16 ranked Bears. Unfortunately this game ended in a blowout against the Ducks. The Ducks then went on to win only three of the final eight games, which included a heartbreaking 28–30 loss to the Beavers in which a late Oregon field goal was blocked by the Beavers. The Ducks did play in a bowl game, representing the Pac-10 in the 2006 Pioneer Las Vegas Bowl. The Ducks ended the season with a 38–8 loss to the 20th ranked Brigham Young Cougars.

Pre-season
February 2 – After Gary Crowton, Oregon's Offensive Coordinator for the 2005 and 2006 seasons, resigned to perform the same duties with Louisiana State University, the University of Oregon hired University of New Hampshire Offensive Coordinator Chip Kelly. While at UNH, Kelly's offenses averaged greater than 400 yards a game in seven of his eight years and over 30 points a game for the previous four years.

April 28 – Green defeated White 20–6 in the 2007 spring game.

April 29 – Jordan Kent, Dante Rosario, and Matt Toeaina were selected in the 2007 NFL Draft. Dante Rosario was selected by the Carolina Panthers as the 18th pick in the fifth round. Matt Toeaina was selected by the Cincinnati Bengals as the 13th pick in the sixth round. Jordan Kent was selected by the Seattle Seahawks as the 36th pick in the sixth round.

May 9 – Former Oregon running back Ahmad Rashad, also known as Bobby Moore, was selected to the Class of 2007 entering the College Football Hall of Fame.

July 26 – During the Pac-10's media day, the pre-season media poll picks the Ducks to finish 6th in the Pac-10.

Recruiting class
The 2007 Oregon football recruiting class was selected by Scout.com as the ninth-best recruiting class of 2007 and was selected by Rivals.com as the 11th-best recruiting class of 2007.  Oregon signed 27 high school seniors and two junior college transfers.

Schedule

ESPN College Gameday
ESPN College Gameday was broadcast live from Eugene, OR on September 29 for the game between then ranked No. 6 California and then ranked No. 11 Oregon.
ESPN College Gameday was broadcast live from Eugene, OR on November 3 for the game between then ranked No. 6 Arizona State and then ranked No. 4 Oregon.

Roster

Coaching staff
Mike Bellotti – Head coach
Steve Greatwood – Offensive line
Nick Aliotti – Defensive coordinator
Chip Kelly – Offensive coordinator & quarterbacks
Gary campbell – Running backs
Michael gray – Defensive line
John neal – Secondary
Tom osborne – Tight ends & special teams
Don Pellum – Linebackers & recruiting coordinator
Robin Pflugrad – Wide receivers
Jim Radcliffe – Head strength and conditioning coach
Eddy morrissey – Graduate assistant coach
Jeff hawkins – Assistant athletic director/football operations

Season notes

Awards
Mike Bellotti
Selected as a semifinalist for the George Munger Award for College Coach of the Year.
Named to the Paul "Bear" Bryant College Football Coach of the Year award.
Patrick Chung
Selected to the Pac-10 All Conference First Team Defense.
Dennis Dixon
Awarded Pac-10 Offensive Player of the Week, USA Today Player of the Week, and Rivals.com Player of the Week for his efforts against the Michigan Wolverines on September 8.
Awarded Pac-10 Offensive Player of the Week for his efforts against the Stanford Cardinal on September 22.
Named to the Maxwell Award watch list.
Named a finalist for the Maxwell Award along with Darren McFadden and Tim Tebow.
Named as one of 15 National Scholar-Athletes by The National Football Foundation & College Football Hall of Fame and is now a finalist for the Draddy Trophy.
Selected as one of 15 semifinalists for the Davey O'Brien Award.
Named a finalist for the Davey O'Brien Award along with Tim Tebow and Chase Daniel.
Awarded Pac-10 Offensive Co-Player of the Week for his efforts against the Arizona State Sun Devils on November 3.
Selected to the ESPN the Magazine Academic All-District 8 first team by college and university sports information directors throughout the western portion of the United States and Canada. District 8 includes Alaska, Arizona, California, Hawaii, Idaho, Nevada, Oregon, Utah, Washington, British Columbia and the Yukon. Dixon is now eligible for ESPN the Magazine Academic All-American consideration.
Named as one of 15 players eligible for the Walter Camp Player of the Year Award.
Front runner for the Heisman Trophy according to ESPN panelists before suffering a torn ACL, effectively ending his season during the game at Arizona.
Announced as one of five finalists for the Walter Camp Award, the other four finalists were Chase Daniel, Matt Ryan, Tim Tebow, and Darren McFadden.
Selected to the Pac-10 All Conference First Team Offense, as well as the Pac-10 Offensive Player of the Year.
Matt Evensen
Selected as a semifinalist for the Lou Groza Award by the Palm Beach County Sports Commission.
Matthew Harper
Awarded Pac-10 Defensive Player of the Week and National Defensive Player of the Week by the Master Coaches Survey for his efforts against the Southern California Trojans on October 28.
Nick Reed
Named to the Ted Hendricks Award watch list.
Awarded Pac-10 Defensive Player of the Week and National Defensive Player of the Week by the Walter Camp Football Foundation for his efforts against the Washington State Cougars on October 13.
Awarded Pac-10 Defensive Player of the Week for his efforts against the Arizona State Sun Devils on November 3.
Selected to the ESPN the Magazine Academic All-District 8 first team by college and university sports information directors throughout the western portion of the United States and Canada. District 8 includes Alaska, Arizona, California, Hawaii, Idaho, Nevada, Oregon, Utah, Washington, British Columbia and the Yukon. Reed is now eligible for ESPN the Magazine Academic All-American consideration.
Selected to the Pac-10 All Conference First Team Defense.
Geoff Schwartz
Selected to the Pac-10 All Conference Second Team Offense.
Jonathan Stewart
Named to the Maxwell Award watch list.
Awarded Pac-10 Offensive Player of the Week for his efforts against the Washington Huskies on October 20.
Named as one of 10 semifinalists for the Doak Walker Award.
Selected to the Pac-10 All Conference First Team Offense and Second Team Specialists as a Kickoff Returner.
Fenuki Tupou
Selected to the Pac-10 All Conference Second Team Offense.
Max Unger
Selected to the Pac-10 All Conference First Team Offense.
Jaison Williams
Named to the Biletnikoff Award watch list.

Team records
On September 8, the Oregon Ducks played in front of 109,733 spectators at the University of Michigan's Michigan Stadium, this total bettered their previous record of 102,247 spectators at the 1995 Rose Bowl against Penn State.
On September 29, 59,273 fans packed Autzen Stadium, making it at the time the largest crowd to attend a football game in state history. The previous record was 59,269 against the Oklahoma Sooners on September 16, 2006.
On October 20, against the Washington Huskies, the Oregon Ducks set a school record for rushing yards in a single game by the entire team, their total was 465 yards. The previous record was 446 yards against the Washington State Cougars in 2001. Also, during the game against the Huskies, RB Jonathan Stewart ran for 251 yards, which was good enough for the second highest total rushing yards in a single game by an individual in Oregon football history. The current record is 285 yards, held by Onterrio Smith during the game against Washington State in 2001.
On October 27, 59,277 fans filled Autzen Stadium, making it the largest crowd to attend a football game in state history. The previous record was 59,273 against the California Bears on September 29.
Also on October 27, the crowd at Autzen Stadium reached a noise level of 127.2 decibels, making it the loudest stadium in college football.  The previous college record was 126 decibels at Clemson's Memorial Stadium. According to the Guinness Book of World Records the loudest outdoor stadium is Mile High Stadium, whose crowd reached a level of 128.7 decibels. However, this is not true, as during the October 6, 2007 game between the University of Florida @ Louisiana State University, CBS recorded 129.8 decibels.
On November 3, for consecutive weeks the Oregon record for number of individuals at a football game had fallen. For the game against the Arizona State Sun Devils 59,379 people were in attendance at Autzen Stadium. The previous record was set on October 27 at 59,277 in attendance.
Also on November 3, Dennis Dixon broke the team record for career yards by a quarterback. The previous record was 1,171 yards by Reggie Ogborn between 1979 and 1980.

Game summaries

Houston

Oregon's Dennis Dixon ran for 141 yards, with an 80-yard run that resulted in a touchdown.  Dixon also threw for 134 yards and two touchdowns, completing nine of 15 passes.  Houston's Anthony Alridge converted 22 carries into 205 yards and one touchdown.  Adridge also caught three passes for 88 yards and a touchdown.  Dixon's 141 rushing yards were the most by an Oregon quarterback since Tony Graziani's 108 yards against Oregon State in 1995.  The score was tied at 20 points in the third quarter when Houston's Case Keenum attempted to throw a pass to Perry McDaniel in the end zone, but it was intercepted by Patrick Chung.  The Ducks then went ahead 27 to 20 after Dixon threw a 24-yard touchdown pass to Brian Paysinger.  Forty seconds after the Paysinger touchdown, Dixon threw another to Jaison Williams, putting the Ducks up 34 to 20.  Houston scored once more and Oregon twice more as the Ducks beat Houston 48 to 27.

The game was also notable for a skirmish between the Ducks' mascot and the Cougars' mascot. The student fulfilling the role of the Duck was suspended soon after.

Michigan

This game was Michigan's worst defeat since 1968 when they lost 50 to 14 at Ohio State. Dennis Dixon accounted for 368 yards and a career-high 4 touchdowns. Three touchdowns were thrown to three different receivers for 85, 61, and 45-yard scoring passes on Dixon's way to 292 throwing yards.  Dixon also rushed for 76 yards and one touchdown.  The Ducks led by 25 at halftime, and faced little opposition in the second half.  According to Oregon coach Mike Bellotti the game was a "good win because I think there were some questions about how Michigan was going to bounce back, and whether we would be competitive.  I think our players took that to heart."  With this game Michigan opened the season with two home losses, the first time that had happened since 1959.  It also gave them a losing streak of four games, the most in four decades.  Wolverines coach Lloyd Carr said "We have good kids and they're hurting.  If losing doesn't make you hurt, you shouldn't be at Michigan."

Fresno State

Oregon's 52–21 defeat of Fresno State was Bellotti's 100th win as a coach at the University of Oregon.  Dennis Dixon threw for two touchdowns and ran for another.  Ducks running back Jonathan Stewart ran for 165 yards and scored two touchdowns, one touchdown being part of an 88-yard run.  Dixon said "The sky's the limit right now. This offense is really clicking."  Although Dixon didn't put up numbers as impressive as he did at Michigan the previous week, he had a solid performance, completing 14 for 20 passes for 139 yards and running for 59 yards.  Oregon's mascot was suspended and watched the game, but not from the sidelines.  Fresno State's quarterback Tom Brandstater completed 18–32 passes for 219 yards and one touchdown.  The loss was Fresno State's second against a ranked team on the road.  The previous week the Bulldogs lost 47–45 to Texas A&M in triple overtime.  Fresno State coach Pat Hill said "[h]ow many times do I have to say it? We got dominated in all three phases. We got beat pretty good today. That doesn't happen at Fresno State very often. Today we got beat by a better football team.  They took it to us. End of conversation."

Stanford

The Ducks beat the Cardinal 55 to 31.

California

The Bears defeated the Ducks 31 to 24. ESPN College GameDay was present (Corso picked Ducks to win)

Washington State

    
    
    
    
    
    
    
    
    
    
    

The Ducks defeated the Cougars 53 to 7.

Washington

    
    
    
    
    
    
    
    
    
    
    
    
    
    
    

The Ducks defeated the Huskies 55 to 34.

USC 

    

The Ducks defeated the Trojans 24 to 17.  Oregon's defensive back Matthew Harper interception on USC's final drive preserved Oregon's victory.  Harper said "We knew somebody would make the play, and luckily it was me."  Oregon's victory set them up for a chance at the national championship.  Number 12 USC (No. 9 AP) lost after Oregon's Jonathan Stewart rushed for 103 yards and two touchdowns, while Dennis Dixon completed 16 of 25 passes for 157 yards.  Oregon was fifth in the BCS standings, and Dixon became a serious Heisman contender with his 76 rushing yards and 157 passing yards.

Arizona State 

In a game that was considered important enough for ESPN's College Gameday to be broadcast in Eugene, the Oregon Ducks defeated the Arizona State Sun Devils 35–23. Heisman hopeful Dennis Dixon threw for 189 yards and 4 touchdowns and led the Ducks to a victory that places Oregon in the lead for the Pac-10 championship.

After the Ducks scored a touchdown on their first possession, a 26-yard pass to WR Jaison Williams, the Sun Devils began to march down the field. Showing the same poise as Dixon, ASU QB Rudy Carpenter led the Devils to the Oregon 2-yard line before the Oregon defense lived up to their "bend but don't break" style and held ASU to a field goal. That goal line stop would set the tone for the remainder of the game as Oregon held Arizona State to only 3 points in the first quarter and 13 in the first half.

Trailing 13–21 at the half, Arizona State was able to make a field goal on their first possession in the second half, cutting the Oregon lead to 5. However, the Ducks were able to score the next 14 points of the game, giving the Ducks a 35–16 lead with one quarter left to play. Unfortunately approximately 2 minutes into the fourth quarter, Dennis Dixon was taken out after an awkward tackle and sat out the remainder of the game. Luckily his injury did not seem serious and he was seen jogging on the sidelines soon afterwards.

Arizona State did score one more touchdown later in the fourth quarter, making the score its final 35–23. In a game which Rudy Carpenter was sacked 9 times, it seemed only fitting that the last play of the game was a sack as time ran out.

Arizona

The Ducks entered the game ranked No. 2 in both the AP poll and the BCS standings. A win in this game, followed by wins against UCLA and Oregon State, would almost assuredly result in a berth in the BCS National Championship Game in New Orleans. The Ducks started the game hot, with a 39-yard touchdown run by Dennis Dixon and a successful two-point conversion. Following an Arizona interception, the Ducks had the ball back on the Arizona 4-yard line threatening to score again. However, Dixon threw an interception that was returned 45 yards and eventually capitalized by the Wildcats as a touchdown, cutting the score to 8–7. The Ducks responded with another solid drive getting the ball to the Arizona 15 and looked set to score again. On 2nd and 7, Oregon quarterback Dennis Dixon (the leading Heisman candidate at this point of the season) fell to the ground without being touched. Upon review it was clear that Dixon twisted his already-injured knee and tore his ACL. It would later be revealed that Dixon had actually torn the ligament in the previous week's game against Arizona State.

Following the injury, Dixon—having amassed 183 yards on 19 plays—was replaced by Brady Leaf. Oregon's misfortunes mounted: Arizona scored a touchdown on an interception return, another on a punt return, and Leaf suffered an ankle injury, all before halftime. Oregon tried to rally from the 14–31 halftime deficit, but lost 24–34, ending their National Championship hopes. The following day it was announced that Dixon's injury would end his season, and any hopes of a Heisman Trophy.

UCLA

Oregon State

As of the 111th game in the series, the Ducks lead 55–46–10 all time. This was the first time the home team had not won since 1996, the first time Oregon State had won at Autzen Stadium since 1993, and the first time Oregon State had won two years in a row since 1973–74.

Sun Bowl

After losing the last 3 games of the year, many analysts expected the Ducks to fare poorly in the Sun Bowl.  But the Ducks came out strong.  Making his first career start, freshman quarterback Justin Roper completed 17 of 30 passes for 180 yards with 4 touchdowns and no interceptions.  Running back Jonathan Stewart rushed for a career-high and Sun Bowl record 253 yards and a touchdown and was named the Most Valuable Player of the game.

Oregon, despite being a 7-point underdog, dominated the game, especially the second half.  Holding on to an 18–14 lead at the half, Oregon came out and outscored South Florida 28–0 in the third quarter.  The Ducks won 56–21.  The 56 points scored was a Sun Bowl record.  Jonathan Stewart's 253 rushing yards were a Sun Bowl record.  The 35-point margin of victory was the second largest of the 2007–2008 bowl season.  The Ducks finished the season 9–4 with their first bowl win since the 2001 season.  They finished the season ranked 23rd in the final Associated Press Poll.

Rankings

Statistics

Team

Scores by quarter

Offense

Rushing

Passing

Receiving

Defense

Special teams

References

Oregon
Oregon Ducks football seasons
Sun Bowl champion seasons
Oregon Ducks football